Rostyslav Vladyslavovych Dehtyar (also transliterated Dehtiar, born 30 March 1999) is a professional Ukrainian footballer who currently plays for Munkach Mukachevo as a goalkeeper.

Club career

MFK Zemplín Michalovce
Dehtyar made his Fortuna Liga debut for Zemplín Michalovce against Spartak Trnava on 27 June 2020.

References

External links
 MFK Zemplín Michalovce official club website 
 
 Rostyslav Dehtiar at Futbalnet 
 Rostyslav Vladyslavovych Dehtiar at Ukrainian Premier League
 

1999 births
Living people
Footballers from Donetsk
Ukrainian footballers
Ukrainian expatriate footballers
Association football goalkeepers
MFK Zemplín Michalovce players
FK Slavoj Trebišov players
MFA Mukachevo players
Slovak Super Liga players
Ukrainian Second League players
Expatriate footballers in Slovakia
Ukrainian expatriate sportspeople in Slovakia